Heteropia is a genus of sponges in the family Heteropiidae, and was first described in 1886 by Henry John Carter. The type species by monotypy is Heteropia ramosa (Carter, 1886), which he first called Aphroceras ramosa in the very same publication.

Distribution 
GBIF with just 37 georeferenced specimens in this genus, shows it having perhaps a world-wide distribution. The  Australian Faunal Directory shows as being found on/off the coast of Western Australia, in the IMCRA regions of Central Western Shelf Transition, Central Western Shelf Province, Northwest Province, and the Central Western Transition.

Accepted species 
(according to WoRMS)

 Heteropia glomerosa (Bowerbank, 1873)
 Heteropia medioarticulata Hôzawa, 1918
 Heteropia minor Burton, 1930
 Heteropia ramosa (Carter, 1886)
 Heteropia rodgeri Lambe, 1900
 Heteropia striata Hôzawa, 1916

References

External links 

Taxa named by Henry John Carter
Animals described in 1886